The 2011 South American Artistic Gymnastics Championships were held in Santiago, Chile, August 4–8, 2011. The competition was organized by the Chilean Gymnastics Federation and approved by the International Gymnastics Federation. This was the 10th edition of the South American Artistic Gymnastics Championships for senior gymnasts.

Participating nations

Medalists

Medal table

References

2011 in gymnastics
South American Gymnastics Championships
International gymnastics competitions hosted by Chile
2013 in Chilean sport